Robert Jensen (11 June 1895 – 6 July 1967) was a Danish footballer. He played in one match for the Denmark national football team in 1925.

References

External links
 

1895 births
1967 deaths
Danish men's footballers
Denmark international footballers
Place of birth missing
Association footballers not categorized by position